Gracie: A Love Story is a 1988 biography of comedian Gracie Allen by George Burns. The tribute to Burns' wife and professional partner reviews their life together and contrasts Allen's scatterbrained public persona with the intelligent actress and devoted wife she actually was.

It was offered as a Book of the Month Club selection. For the audiobook version, Burns received the 1991 Grammy Award for Best Spoken Word Album.

Publication history
 1988: New York: G. P. Putnam's Sons, 1988, hardcover 
 1988: New York: Simon & Schuster Audioworks, 1988, audiocassette
 1989: New York: Penguin Books, November 1, 1989, paperback

References

1988 non-fiction books
G. P. Putnam's Sons books
American biographies
George Burns
Gracie Allen
Biographies about actors